Selvakumar S. K. is an Indian cinematographer who works in the Tamil film industry. He is best known for his works in Maanagaram, Mehandi Circus, and Gypsy.

Early life and education

Selvakumar began painting in his early school life. He started to paint and recreate the pictures he found in magazines. Over time, he realized he wanted to make his own original images. And thus began his introduction to photography. Soon, his interest in painting was overtaken by his interest towards photography.

Selvakumar graduated with a Bachelor of Science degree in Visual Communication, from Madras Christian College. While in college, he learned a lot about the art of cinematography and slowly his interest in photography developed into a passion for cinematography. He started watching the works of legendary cinematographers and was in awe of their works. He worked as the cinematographer for more than 50 short films, during and after his college days.

Career 
After completing his college education, Selvakumar assisted cinematographer, George C. Williams, in Raja Rani and Kaththi. He made his feature film debut with Maanagaram (2017), and garnered high acclaim for his work in the film. Selvakumar worked on several films including Gypsy (2020) and Dharala Prabhu. Regarding his work in Gypsy, a critic noted that "Selvakumar’s camera switches between its role as a silent spectator when Gypsy goes about his daily duties and, at the same time, breathtakingly captures the gorgeous locations in all its splendour".

Filmography 
 All films are in Tamil, unless otherwise noted.

References

External links 
 

Living people
Tamil film cinematographers
Year of birth missing (living people)